Dimo (Bulgarian or Macedonian: Димо) may refer to the following people:
Given name
Dimo Angelov Tonchev (born 1952), Bulgarian cyclist 
Dimo Atanasov (born 1985), Bulgarian football player
Dimo Bakalov (born 1988), Bulgarian football player
Dimo Hadzhidimov (1875–1924), Bulgarian revolutionary
Dimo Hamaambo (1932–2002), Namibian military commander 
Dimo Hyun Jun Kim (born 1991), South Korean theatre director 
Dimo Kostov  (born 1947), Bulgarian wrestler
Dimo Krastinov (born 1946), Bulgarian ice hockey player
Dimo Todorovski (1910–1983), Macedonian artist 
Dimo Tonev (born 1964), Bulgarian volleyball player 
Dimo Wache (born 1973), German football player

Surname
Amarildo Dimo (born 1982), Albanian football defender 
Paul Dimo (1905–1990), Romanian electrical engineer

See also
Dimos

Bulgarian masculine given names